Jani Kallunki (born 5 November 1975) is a retired Finnish Paralympic judoka who competed in international level events, he also participated in goalball at the 1996 Summer Paralympics where he won the gold medal for his country. He is a double Paralympic bronze medalist, a European champion and a World bronze medalist.

Kallunki was born in Sweden to Finnish parents, he started wrestling when he was six years old. He then switched to goalball aged sixteen and played for the national team who won the gold medal at the 1996 Summer Paralympics.

Kallunki retired from sport in 2014 after a 30 year sporting career due to a relapsed neck injury from the 2012 IBSA World Judo Championships.

References

1975 births
Living people
Sportspeople from Vantaa
Finnish male judoka
Paralympic goalball players of Finland
Goalball players at the 1996 Summer Paralympics
Goalball players at the 2000 Summer Paralympics
Judoka at the 2004 Summer Paralympics
Judoka at the 2008 Summer Paralympics
Judoka at the 2012 Summer Paralympics
Medalists at the 1996 Summer Paralympics
Medalists at the 2004 Summer Paralympics
Medalists at the 2008 Summer Paralympics
Swedish emigrants to Finland